Vabres Cathedral (Cathédrale Saint-Sauveur-et-Saint-Pierre de Vabres) is a Roman Catholic church and former cathedral in Vabres-l'Abbaye, France.

It was formerly the seat of the Bishopric of Vabres, established in 1317 and abolished under the Concordat of 1801.

Sources

 Catholic Hierarchy: Diocese of Vabres

Former cathedrals in France
Churches in Aveyron